Temminck's trident bat (Aselliscus tricuspidatus) is a species of bat in the family Hipposideridae. It is found in Indonesia, Papua New Guinea, the Solomon Islands, and Vanuatu.

References

Simmons, N.B. 2005. Order Chiroptera. Pp. 312–529 in Wilson, D.E. and Reeder, D.M. (eds.). Mammal Species of the World: a taxonomic and geographic reference. 3rd ed. Baltimore: The Johns Hopkins University Press, 2 vols., 2142 pp. 

Aselliscus
Bats of Oceania
Bats of Indonesia
Mammals of Papua New Guinea
Mammals of Western New Guinea
Mammals of the Solomon Islands
Mammals described in 1835
Taxonomy articles created by Polbot
Taxa named by Coenraad Jacob Temminck
Bats of New Guinea